Riez (Provençal: Riés) is a commune in the Alpes-de-Haute-Provence department in southeastern France.

Geography
The densely built village sits where two small rivers join—the Auvestre and the Colostre—in a glacially widened valley.

Population

Economy
Riez is located in a district of fields of commercially grown lavender, which support a honey-making industry. Truffles are found: there is a weekly truffle market on Wednesdays from late November through March.

History

The domed hill was the hillfort headquarters of the Reii a Celto-Ligurian tribe, who gave their name to the Roman community in the valley floor near it: Alebaece Reiorum it was called, then Alebaece Reiorum Apollinares from the Roman temple of Apollo from which four Corinthian columns yet stand. The name evolved to Regium (until the 8th century) then Regina (until the 11th century).

A bishop of Riez is known from an early date, though the first bishop is purely legendary. At the beginning of the 5th century, a certain St. Prosper of Reggio in Emilia figures in the history of Riez and was perhaps its bishop; however, the first definitely known bishop, according to the Catholic Encyclopedia, was St. Maximus (433–460), who succeeded St. Honoratus as Abbot of Lérins and who, in 439, held a council at Riez with a view to effecting ecclesiastical reforms in the churches of southern Gaul. His name is commemorated in the Mont St-Maxime, which is surmounted by the Chapelle St-Maxim (a nunnery). His successor, St. Faustus of Riez (c. 461 – c. 493), also formerly Abbot of Lérins, was noted for his writings against Predestinationists; it was to him that Sidonius Apollinaris dedicated his Carmen Eucharisticum, in gratitude for hospitality received at Riez. Contumeliosus of Riez was deposed for adultery in 534. At a much later date Robert Ceneau (1530–1532), the pulpit orator afterwards Bishop of Avranches, and Gui Bentivoglio (1622–1625), the papal nuncio in France and a defender of French interests at Rome, who played an important role under Louis XIII, are also mentioned among the bishops of Riez. The diocese was suppressed on 29 November 1801, and its territory included in the diocese of Digne .

The 5th-century free-standing baptistery (its small dome rebuilt in the 12th century) is one of only a few surviving from Christian Gaul; it was built about 100 meters from the healing waters that had been sacred to Aesculapius, son of Apollo, to whom a dedicatory inscription was found in the 17th century. In the Christianized landscape Riez retained its reputation for healing waters into the 19th century . The former cathedral, located on the axis of the baptistery, was constructed on top of a much larger Roman public building from the 1st–2nd century; it was destroyed at the end of the 15th century. Excavations have revealed a 5th-century structure in the field across the road east of the baptistery. The present small cathedral is dedicated to Nôtre-Dame-de-l'Assomption.

In the Middle Ages, the new structures of the town were gradually built away  from the junction adjacent to the rivers to slightly higher ground because of a rising river. Alluvial silt deposited in the beds of the small rivers—a familiar result of deforestation in the rivers' upper watersheds—had raised the beds of the rivers and extended the floodplain. Deep alluvium still covers much of the Roman site of Reii Appolinares.

Sites
Today the baptistery contains a small archaeological museum of altars and funerary steles and a collection of Roman inscriptions, which include an inscribed taurobolium altar. There is a cylindrical milestone from the Aurelian Way. In the Hôtel de ville is the Natural History Museum of Provence.

See also
Communes of the Alpes-de-Haute-Provence department
List of works by Louis Botinelly

References

Catholic Encyclopedia: "Digne"
Richard Stillwell, ed. Princeton Encyclopedia of Classical Sites, 1976: "Alebaece Reiorum Apollinarium (Riez) Alpes de Haute-Provence, France"

External links

 Town's website 

Communes of Alpes-de-Haute-Provence
Alpes-de-Haute-Provence communes articles needing translation from French Wikipedia